The Virgin of the Councillors is a panel painting in oils by Lluís Dalmau now in the National Art Museum of Catalonia in Barcelona. It was commissioned in 1443.

Description 
The prestige attached to Burgundian courtly culture and the painter Jan van Eyck explain why in 1431 King Alfonso the Magnanimous sent his official painter, the Valencian Lluís Dalmau, to Flanders, to learn the new realist language firsthand. In 1443, Dalmau was commissioned to paint this altarpiece for the chapel of the City Hall. This work was a breakthrough in Catalonia on account of the format, the technique used, as it was painted in oil, and the skilful illusionism of a figurative space in which that year's five councillors, painted from life, are represented on the same scale as the Virgin and the Saints.

References

External links 
 The artwork at Museum's website

Paintings in the collection of the Museu Nacional d'Art de Catalunya
1445 paintings
Paintings of the Madonna and Child
Altarpieces